The Sons of Hercules is a syndicated Embassy Pictures television show that aired in the United States in the 1960s.  The series repackaged 13 Italian sword-and-sandal films by giving them a standardized theme song for the opening and closing titles, as well as a standard introductory narration attempting to relate the lead character in each film to the Greek demigod Hercules. These films however were not all originally made as "Hercules" films in Italy.  Although two of them did originally feature Hercules (and not his sons), four of the films were originally Maciste movies in Italy, and the others were just isolated gladiator or mythological hero movies not released theatrically in the US.

Films in the series
There were 13 films in the Sons of Hercules syndication package. The first title listed for each film was its American television title, followed by the translated original Italian title in parentheses: 
(Note* - Some channels broke the films up into two parts, and showed them in two weekly one-hour time slots as if it were a weekly TV series.)

 Mole Men vs the Son of Hercules (Maciste, the Strongest Man in the World) 1961, starring Mark Forest
 Triumph of the Son of Hercules (The Triumph of Maciste) 1961, starring Kirk Morris
 Fire Monsters Against the Son of Hercules (Maciste vs the Monsters) 1962, starring Reg Lewis
 Venus Against the Son of Hercules (Mars, God Of War) 1962, starring Roger Browne
 Ulysses Against the Son of Hercules (Ulysses against Hercules) 1962, starring Mike Lane
 Medusa Against the Son of Hercules (Perseus the Invincible) 1962, starring Richard Harrison
 Son of Hercules in the Land of Fire (Ursus In The Land Of Fire) 1963, starring Ed Fury
 Tyrant of Lydia Against The Son of Hercules (Goliath and the Rebel Slave) 1963, starring Gordon Scott
 Messalina Against the Son of Hercules (The Last Gladiator) 1963, starring Richard Harrison
 The Beast of Babylon Against the Son of Hercules (Hero Of Babylon) 1963, a.k.a. Goliath, King of the Slaves, starring Gordon Scott
 Terror of Rome Against the Son of Hercules (Maciste, Gladiator of Sparta) 1964, starring Mark Forest
 Son of Hercules in the Land of Darkness (Hercules the Invincible) 1964, starring Dan Vadis
 Devil of the Desert Against the Son of Hercules (Anthar the Invincible) 1964, (a.k.a. The Slave Merchants, a.k.a. Soraya, Queen of the Desert) starring Kirk Morris, directed by Antonio Margheriti

See also
 Samson
 Steve Reeves
 Sword-and-sandal

American film series
Peplum films
American motion picture television series
Sword and sandal films